Gothenburg is a city in Sweden.

Gothenburg may also refer to:

Sweden
 Gothenburg Airport (disambiguation)
 Gothenburg Municipality, in Västra Götaland County, Sweden
 Gothenburg Municipality (Riksdag constituency)
 Gothenburg Public House System
 EA Gothenburg, a Swedish video game developer owned by Electronic Arts
 Metropolitan Gothenburg, a metropolitan area surrounding the city of Gothenburg, Sweden
 University of Gothenburg

Other places
 Gothenburg, Nebraska, United States

See also
 
 Göteborg (disambiguation)
 Götheborg (ship), a large 18th-century wooden sail ship